Chandikhole is a place in Jajpur district, Odisha, India. The place has been named after Goddess "Chandi" worshipped by late monk Baba Bhairabananda Bramhachari who established the deity of Maa Chandi in one of the adjoining hills of Barunei full of dense forest and ferocious animals in 1932. Chandikhol has been selected for the establishment of one of Strategic Petroleum Reserve (India) location.

Geography
It is located in the Jajpur District of Odisha.

Location
Chandikhole is one of the end points of National Highway 200, the other end being Raipur. National Highway 16 passes through Chandikhole.

Nearest airport is Biju Patnaik Airport at Bhubaneswar, which is at a distance of about 70 km. It is an extremely strategic location in terms of commerce as it acts as a junction between Kalinganagar, Cuttack, Bhadrak and Paradeep. 

The nearest town is Jaraka which is 12 km away from this place.

See also
 Mahavinayak Temple
Jaraka

References

External links
 Map of Jajpur district with Chandikhole marked

Cities and towns in Jajpur district